Nandri is a 1984 Indian Tamil-language drama thriller film, directed and scripted by Rama Narayanan, with story written by Abbaiah Naidu. Music was by Shankar–Ganesh. It stars Karthik, Nalini, Mahalakshmi and Arjun, with a dog named Brownie in a pivotal role. Arjun made his acting debut in Tamil with this film. It is a remake of the Kannada film Thaliya Bhagya.

Plot

Cast 

 Karthik as Officer Shankar
 Nalini as Lakshmi
 Mahalakshmi as Saratha
 Arjun as Murugan
 Sangili Murugan as Sathyanathan, the village chairman
 S. S. Chandran as Punniyakodi
 A. V. M. Rajan as D. I. G.
 Brownie as Raja (Dog), Shankar's pet
 M. R. K as Dharmalingam
 Peeli Sivam as Inspector
 Master Vimal as Ramu
 Shankar–Ganesh as Mentally Challenged (guest appearance)
 Senthil as guest appearance
 Anuradha as guest appearance

Soundtrack 
Music was by Shankar–Ganesh and lyrics were written by Vaali.

References

External links 
 

1980s Tamil-language films
1980s thriller drama films
1984 drama films
1984 films
Films directed by Rama Narayanan
Films scored by Shankar–Ganesh
Indian thriller drama films
Tamil remakes of Kannada films